María Isabel Soldevila Brea (b. Santo Domingo) is a journalist, academician, columnist, television presenter, and writer from the Dominican Republic.

Biography
When Soldevila was 18 years old, she began an internship at Listin Diario.

Soldevila studied Journalism in New York City with a Fulbright Program scholarship at Columbia University and obtained a Master's degree; in France, she studied French language and civilisation.

Soldevilla later worked for the newspaper Hoy and the magazine Rumbo. She was editor-in-chief of the newspaper Listín Diario, the largest print media in the Dominican Republic. Since September 2013 she is associate producer and news presenter at NCDN, a broadcast news network.
Soldevila has been director of the School of Communication at the Pontifical Catholic University Mother and Teacher.

Since February 2017, she is the Executive Manager and Communication Director of the Institute for European Studies at the Université libre de Bruxelles. She is also currently a Knight Wallace Fellow at the University of Michigan.

References

External links 

1970s births
Living people
People from Santo Domingo
Dominican Republic people of Catalan descent
Columbia University Graduate School of Journalism alumni
New York University alumni
University of Paris alumni
Academic staff of the Pontificia Universidad Católica Madre y Maestra
Dominican Republic journalists
Dominican Republic women journalists
Dominican Republic newspaper editors
Dominican Republic television presenters
Dominican Republic women writers
Dominican Republic short story writers
Dominican Republic women academics
Women newspaper editors
Dominican Republic women short story writers
Dominican Republic women television presenters
University of Michigan fellows
White Dominicans
Fulbright alumni